Flat-headed loach (Oreonectes platycephalus) is a species of cyprinid fish. It is found in fast-flowing streams in southern China (including Hong Kong) and northern Vietnam. It grows to  total length.

References

Oreonectes
Freshwater fish of China
Fauna of Hong Kong
Fish of Vietnam
Fish described in 1868
Taxa named by Albert Günther